The Cyclone Taylor Cup tournament serves as the British Columbia Provincial Junior B Hockey Championship.  The annual tournament is held amongst the champions of British Columbia's three Junior B, C, D|Junior B ice hockey leagues, as well as a host team.  The winner of the Cyclone Taylor Cup moves on to the Western Canada Junior B championship, the Keystone Cup.

The tournament and championship trophy is named after Hockey Hall of Famer Cyclone Taylor, who led the Vancouver Millionaires in goals during their 1915 Stanley Cup Finals victory.

Tournament Organization
The tournament is played between four teams in a single round-robin format.  The top two teams meet in the championship game.

The 2019 qualifiers are as follows:

Cyclone Taylor Cup 2019
In Richmond, British Columbia

Round Robin

Championship Round
See playoff round below

Champions

Playdown Era
Bolded are Cyclone Taylor Cup champions.  Italics represents runner-up. 

After the implementation of the round robin during the 2003-04 season, (Rep) denotes a league runner-up that gained access to the tournament because their league champion was also the tournament host. 

Prior to the 2003-04 season, the hosting duties were rotated through the three leagues, with the champions from the other two leagues playing off for the right to meet the host league's champion. The winner would then face the host league's champion in a best-of-three series for the Cyclone Taylor Cup, played over one weekend.

Round Robin Format

References
List of Champions
Tournament format
Cyclone Taylor Cup website

Ice hockey tournaments in Canada
Ice hockey in British Columbia